Bromochloromethane or methylene bromochloride and Halon 1011 is a mixed halomethane. It is a heavy low-viscosity liquid with refractive index 1.4808.

Halon 1011 was invented for use in fire extinguishers in Germany during the mid-1940s, in an attempt to create a less toxic, more effective alternative to carbon tetrachloride. This was a concern in aircraft and tanks as carbon tetrachloride produced highly toxic by-products when discharged onto a fire. It was slightly less toxic, and used up until the late 1960s, being officially banned by the NFPA for use in fire extinguishers in 1969, as safer and more effective agents such as halon 1211 and 1301 were developed. Due to its ozone depletion potential its production was banned from January 1, 2002, at the Eleventh Meeting of the Parties for the Montreal Protocol on Substances that Deplete the Ozone Layer.

Bromochloromethane's biodegradation is catalyzed by the hydrolase enzyme alkylhalidase:

CH2BrCl  + H2O   →   CH2O + HBr + HCl

Preparation
Bromochloromethane is prepared commercially from dichloromethane:
6 CH2Cl2  + 3 Br2  + 2 Al  →  6 CH2BrCl  +  2 AlCl3
CH2Cl2  + HBr  →  CH2BrCl  +  HCl
The latter route requires aluminium trichloride as a catalyst.  The bromochloromethane is often used as a precursor to methylene bromide.

References

External links
 
 
 Notice with Respect to n-Propyl Bromide and Bromochloromethane
 Chemical fact sheet
 Data sheet at albemarle.com

Halomethanes
Fire suppression agents
Ozone depletion
Organobromides
Organochlorides